Ożumiech  is a village in the administrative district of Gmina Krzynowłoga Mała, within Przasnysz County, Masovian Voivodeship, in east-central Poland.

During the Nazi occupation of Poland, it was part of the New Berlin military training area.

References

Villages in Przasnysz County